South African Journal of Economics is a quarterly peer-reviewed economics journal published by Wiley-Blackwell on behalf of the Economic Society of South Africa (ESSA). The journal was established in 1933. The journal publishes information on economic issues affecting African countries. General topics of focus include health issues, inflation issues, monetary and fiscal policy issues, regulatory issues and information on the South African Political Economy.

According to the Journal Citation Reports, the journal has a 2016 impact factor of 0.685, ranking it 225th out of 347 journals in the category "Economics".

History 
During Apartheid the Journal experienced significant challenges to remain viable due to a lack of foreign contributions and emigration of young South African economics graduates.

References

External links 
 

Wiley-Blackwell academic journals
English-language journals
Publications established in 1933
Quarterly journals
Economics journals
1933 establishments in South Africa
Academic journals published in South Africa